Insel der Träume  (Island of Dreams) was a German-Austrian television series, produced between 1990–1991.

After the final season of "Die Schwarzwaldklinik" (The Black Forest Clinic), the German TV-station ZDF (Zweites Deutsches Fernsehen, i.e. 2nd German Network) wanted to repeat the series' success and accepted Wolfgang Rademann's proposal for another adaption of a US-American TV-series. While already Die Schwarzwaldklinik was inspired by General Hospital, Rademann that time tried to transform the successful US-series Fantasy Island into a German version.

As well as Fantasy Island, Insel der Träume sets on a tropical island (Kawaii) somewhere in the Pacific. Each episode was about a guest coming from Germany to that isle hosted by the older, always white-dressed "professor" Gregor Sartorius and his young daughter Sandra.

Different from its American model (but according to Die Schwarzwaldklinik as a medical drama), it was openly presented that the island's visitors came there to become healed from a psychological problem. After a number of (therapeutical) talks with Sartorius or his daughter, the guests were brought to a mysterious waterfall, where they recognised during some kind of a vision the (true) reason for their problems. At the end of each episode, every guest left the island with a solution for his/ her problem or at least with a newly gained positive attitude towards life's complications.

Although copying its concept of happy-ending drama stories garnished with pictures of beautiful landscapes, Insel der Träume could not repeat the success of Die Schwarzwaldklinik and was cancelled after the second season.

External links
 

1991 German television series debuts
1991 German television series endings
Television shows set on islands
German-language television shows
ZDF original programming